The Interstate Highway System of the United States, in addition to being a network of freeways, also includes a number of Business Routes assigned by the American Association of State Highway and Transportation Officials (AASHTO). These routes connect a central or commercial district of a city or town with an Interstate bypass, and are signed with green shields resembling the Interstate Highway shield. The word BUSINESS is used instead of INTERSTATE, and, above the number, where the state name is sometimes included, the word LOOP or SPUR appears. A business loop has both ends as its "parent", while a business spur has a "dangling end", sometimes running from the end of the Interstate to the downtown area.

As the main purpose of a Business Interstate is to serve a downtown area, it is typically routed on surface roads. Thus Business Interstates do not have to meet Interstate Highway standards and are not considered part of the Interstate Highway System. AASHTO does, however, apply similar standards as to new U.S. Highways, requiring a new Business Interstate to meet certain design standards. Business Interstates are also sometimes routed onto freeways that were once designated as mainline Interstates themselves, such as the now-decommissioned Interstate 40 Business in Winston-Salem, North Carolina, and the existing Interstate 80 Business in Sacramento, California.

Business Interstates are most often posted in the western states, across the Great Plains and in Michigan. Eastern states generally did not designate business routes, as most of the Interstates paralleled the original U.S. Highways instead of directly replacing them. With the exception of mountainous areas, this left most of the U.S. Highways in place, or as co-signed routes with the parent Interstate, while the former routes were redesignated as local or frontage roads. In contrast, construction of the Interstate system in the western states often directly overlaid the old U.S. Highway, leaving the former road impassable or as a disconnected route. Exceptions were at cities and towns, where the freeway would shift onto a bypass around them. This often left extant segments of old U.S. Highways in place, with a business route designation applied to them as a motorist aid to and from a business district of collection of motorists services.

Like auxiliary Interstate Highways, Business Interstates can be repeated from state to state along their route. However, unlike auxiliary Interstate Highways, Business Interstates can also be repeated in several locations within the same state.

List
Defunct routes are listed in italics.

Interstate 5

I-5 Bus.—San Ysidro, National City and San Diego, California 
I-5 Bus.—San Diego, California 
I-5 Bus.—Solana Beach, California 
I-5 Bus.—San Clemente, California
I-5 Bus.—Irvine, California 
I-5 Bus.—Los Angeles, California 
I-5 Bus.–Coalinga, California
I-5 Bus.—Woodland, California 
I-5 Bus.—Arbuckle, California 
I-5 Bus.—Williams and Maxwell, California 
I-5 Bus.—Willows and Orland, California 
I-5 Bus.—Red Bluff, California I-5 Bus.—Cottonwood, California I-5 Bus.—Anderson and Redding, California
I-5 Bus.—Dunsmuir, California 
I-5 Bus.—Mount Shasta, California 
I-5 Bus.—Weed, California  
I-5 Bus.—Yreka, California I-5 Bus.—Vancouver, Washington 
I-5 Bus.—Castle Rock, Washington I-5 Bus.—Chehalis and Centralia, Washington I-5 Bus.—Olympia, Washington I-5 Bus.—Fife, Washington and Midway (near Des Moines, Washington)I-5 Bus.—Seattle, Washington I-5 Bus.—Marysville, Washington and Everett, WashingtonI-5 Bus.—Bellingham, Washington

Interstate 205
I-205 Bus.—Tracy, California 

Interstate 8I-8 Bus.—San Diego, California 
I-8 Bus.—El Cajon, California I-8 Bus.—Alpine, California 
I-8 Bus.—El Centro, California 
State Bus. Route 8 (1)—Winterhaven, California and Yuma, Arizona 
State Bus. Route 8 (3)—Gila Bend, Arizona

Interstate 10I-10 Bus.—Ontario, CaliforniaI-10 Bus.—Colton, California I-10 Bus.—Indio, California 
I-10 Bus.—Blythe, California 
State Bus. Route 10 (1)—Quartzsite, Arizona State Bus. Route 10—Phoenix, Arizona State Bus. Route 10—Casa Grande, Arizona State Bus. Route 10 (2)—Tucson, Arizona 
State Bus. Route 10 (3)—Benson, Arizona State Bus. Route 10 Spur—Benson, Arizona 
State Bus. Route 10 (4)—Willcox, Arizona 
State Bus. Route 10 (5)—Bowie, Arizona 
State Bus. Route 10 (6)—San Simon, Arizona 
BL 21—Lordsburg, New Mexico 
BL 22—Deming, New Mexico BL—Las Cruces, New Mexico 
Bus. I-10-C—Sierra Blanca, Texas 
Bus. I-10-D—Van Horn, Texas 
Bus. I-10-F—Balmorhea, Texas 
Bus. I-10-G—Fort Stockton, Texas 

Interstate 15

I-15 Bus.—Escondido, California 
I-15 Bus.—Victorville, California 
I-15 Bus.—Barstow, California I-15 Bus.—Mesquite, Nevada 
I-15 Bus.- St. George, Utah 
I-15 Bus.—Cedar City, Utah 
I-15 Bus.—Parowan, Utah 
I-15 Bus.—Beaver, Utah 
I-15 Bus.—Fillmore, Utah I-15 Bus.—Holden, Utah 
I-15 Bus.—Nephi, Utah I-15 Bus.—Layton, Utah 
I-15 Bus.—Brigham City, Utah 
I-15 Bus.—Tremonton, Utah 
I-15 Bus.—Pocatello, Idaho 
I-15 Bus.—Idaho Falls, Idaho 
I-15 Bus.—Butte, Montana 
I-15 Bus.—Helena, Montana 
I-15 Bus.—Great Falls, Montana 
I-15 Bus.—Conrad, Montana 
I-15 Bus.—Shelby, Montana

Interstate 17State Bus. Route 17—Black Canyon City, Arizona 

Interstate 19
State Bus. Route 19 (1)—Nogales, ArizonaState Bus. Route 19 (2)—Sahuarita, Arizona – Tucson, Arizona (Still shown on all Rand McNally road atlases.)

Interstate 20

Bus. I-20-B—Pecos, Barstow, Texas 
Bus. I-20-D—Monahans, Texas 
Bus. I-20-E—Odessa, Midland, Texas 
Bus. I-20-F—Stanton, Texas 
Bus. I-20-G—Big Spring, Texas
Bus. I-20-H—Westbrook, Texas 
Bus. I-20-J—Colorado City, Texas 
Bus. I-20-K—Loraine, Texas 
Bus. I-20-L—Roscoe, Texas 
Bus. I-20-M—Sweetwater, Texas 
Bus. I-20-N—Trent, Texas 
Bus. I-20-P—Merkel, Texas 
Business I-20-Q—Tye, Texas 
Bus. I-20-R—Abilene, Texas 
Bus. I-20-T—Baird, Texas 
I-20 BS—Florence, South Carolina 

Interstate 24
I-24 Bus.—Paducah, Kentucky Downtown Loop ¹—Paducah, Kentucky 

¹ Downtown Loop I-24 in Paducah, Kentucky was changed to Business Loop I-24 in 2002.

Interstate 25

BL (11)—Williamsburg, New Mexico – Truth or Consequences, New Mexico 
BL (12)—Socorro, New Mexico 
BL (13)—Belen, New Mexico BL (14)—Santa Fe, New Mexico 
BL (15)—Las Vegas, New Mexico 
BL (16)—Springer, New Mexico 
BL (17)—Raton, New Mexico State Highway 25A—Trinidad, Colorado
State Highway 25B Spur—Aguilar, Colorado
State Highway 25C—Walsenburg, ColoradoState Highway 25 Bus.—Colorado Springs, ColoradoState Highway 25 Bus.—Castle Rock, Colorado (Likely unsigned)
I-25 Bus.—Cheyenne, Wyoming
I-25 Bus.—Chugwater, Wyoming
I-25 Bus.—Wheatland, Wyoming
I-25 Bus.—Douglas, Wyoming
I-25 Bus.—Glenrock, Wyoming
I-25 Bus.—Casper, Wyoming
I-25 Bus.—Buffalo, Wyoming

Interstate 126I-126 BS—Columbia, South Carolina

Interstate 526
I-526 BS—Mount Pleasant, South Carolina 

Interstate 27
Bus. I-27-T—Hale Center, Texas
Bus. I-27-U—Plainview, Texas

Interstate 29

I-29 Bus.—Saint Joseph, Missouri
I-29 Bus.—Elk Point, South Dakota
I-29 Bus.—Brookings, South Dakota
I-29 Downtown Spur—Sioux Falls, South Dakota
I-29P Bus.—North Sioux City, South Dakota (unsigned)

Interstate 229
I-229 Downtown Loop—Sioux Falls, South Dakota

Interstate 30I-30 Bus.—Benton, ArkansasI-30 Bus.—Little Rock, Arkansas

Interstate 35

BS I-35-A—Laredo, Texas
Bus. I-35-B—Encinal, Texas
Bus. I-35-C—Cotulla, Texas
Bus. I-35-D—Dilley, Texas
Bus. I-35-E—Pearsall, Texas
Bus. I-35-H—New Braunfels, Texas
Bus. I-35-J—Kyle, Texas
Bus. I-35-L—Round Rock, TexasBus. I-35-M—Georgetown, Texas (Cancelled July 2006)
BS I-35-V—Alvarado, Texas
Bus. I-35-X—Sanger, Texas
I-35 BL—Ames, Iowa
I-35 BL—Clear Lake, Iowa
I-35 Bus.—Faribault, Minnesota
I-35 Bus.—Albert Lea, Minnesota
I-35 Bus.—Pine City, Minnesota

Interstate 40

I-40 Bus.—Needles, California State Bus. Route 40 (0)—Kingman, Arizona 
State Bus. Route 40 (1)—Seligman, Arizona
State Bus. Route 40 (2)—Ash Fork, Arizona State Bus. Route 40 (3)—Williams, Arizona 
State Bus. Route 40 (4)—Flagstaff, Arizona State Bus. Route 40 (5)—Flagstaff, ArizonaState Bus. Route 40 (6)—Winslow, Arizona 
State Route 40 Spur—Winslow, Arizona 
State Bus. Route 40 (7)—Joseph City, Arizona 
State Bus. Route 40 (8)—Holbrook, Arizona I-40 Bus.—Gallup, New Mexico I-40 Bus.—Grants, New Mexico I-40 Bus.—Albuquerque, New Mexico 
Bus. Route 40 (34)—Moriarty, New Mexico 
Bus. Route 40 (35)—Santa Rosa, New Mexico 
Bus. Route 40 (36)—Tucumcari, New Mexico 
Bus. I-40-A†—Glenrio, Texas 
Bus. I-40-B—Adrian, Texas 
Bus. I-40-C—Vega, Texas 
Bus. I-40-D—Amarillo, Texas 
Bus. I-40-F—Groom, Texas 
Bus. I-40-H—McLean, Texas 
Bus. I-40-J—Shamrock, Texas 
I-40 Bus.—Erick, Oklahoma 
I-40 Bus.—Sayre, Oklahoma 
I-40 Bus.—Elk City, Oklahoma 
I-40 Bus.—Clinton, Oklahoma 
I-40 Bus.—Weatherford, Oklahoma 
I-40 Bus.—El Reno, Oklahoma 
I-40 Bus.—Henryetta, Oklahoma 
I-40 Bus.—Sallisaw, Oklahoma I-40 Bus.—Winston-Salem and Greensboro, North Carolina (Winston-Salem portion removed in February 2020; Greensboro portion (separated by a six-mile gap) removed September 2008)I-40 Bus.—Raleigh, North Carolina (Replaced by Interstate 440)

† Business Loop I-40 for Glenrio, Texas is a spur route (at the New Mexico state line it becomes a country road), but is posted as a business loop.

Interstate 44

I-44 Bus.—Joplin, Missouri
I-44 Bus.—Sarcoxie, Missouri
I-44 Bus.—Mount Vernon, Missouri
I-44 Bus.—Springfield, Missouri
I-44 Bus.—Lebanon, Missouri
I-44 Bus.—Waynesville/St. Robert, Missouri
I-44 BS—Ft. Leonard Wood, Missouri
I-44 Bus.—Rolla, Missouri
I-44 Bus.—Pacific, Missouri

Interstate 45

Bus. I-45-F—Corsicana, Texas
Bus. I-45-G—Ennis, Texas
Bus. I-45-H—Palmer, Texas
Bus. I-45-J—Ferris, Texas

Interstate 49

I-49 Bus.—Neosho, Missouri
I-49 Bus.—Joplin, Missouri
I-49 Bus.—Nevada, Missouri
I-49 Bus.—Butler, Missouri

Interstate 55
I-55 Bus.—New Madrid, Missouri
I-55 Bus.—Cape Girardeau-Fruitland, Missouri
I-55 Bus.—Crystal City, Missouri
I-55 Bus.—Springfield, Illinois
I-55 Bus.—Lincoln, Illinois
I-55 Bus.—Bloomington-Normal, Illinois

Interstate 65I-65 Bus.—Lebanon, Indiana

Interstate 69

BL I-69—Charlotte, Michigan
BL I-69—Coldwater, Michigan
BL I-69—Lansing, Michigan
BL I-69—Port Huron, Michigan

Interstate 70

I-70 Bus.—Richfield, Utah
I-70 BS—Salina, Utah
I-70 Bus.—Green River, Utah
I-70 Bus.—Grand Junction, ColoradoI-70 Bus.—Palisade, ColoradoI-70 Bus.—Rifle, Colorado (Unsigned)
I-70 Bus.—Silt, Colorado (Unsigned)
I-70 Bus.—Eagle, Colorado (Unsigned)
I-70 Bus.—Edwards, Colorado (Unsigned)I-70 Bus.—Avon, ColoradoI-70 Bus.—Frisco, Colorado
I-70 Bus.—Idaho Springs, Colorado
I-70 Bus.—Denver, Colorado
I-70 Bus.—Watkins, Colorado
I-70 Bus.—Strasburg, Colorado (Unsigned)
I-70 Bus.—Deer Trail, Colorado (Unsigned)
I-70 Bus.—Agate, Colorado (Unsigned)
I-70 Bus.—Limon, Colorado
I-70 Bus.—Vona, Colorado (Unsigned)
I-70 Bus.—Burlington, ColoradoI-70 Bus.—Colby, KansasI-70 Bus.—Oakley, KansasI-70 Bus.—Hays, Kansas
I-70 Bus.—Boonville, Missouri
I-70 Bus.—Columbia, Missouri
I-70 Bus.—St. Charles, MissouriI-70 Bus.—Springfield, Ohio

Interstate 72
I-72 Bus.—Jacksonville, Illinois

Interstate 75

BS I-75—Sault Ste. Marie, Michigan
BL I-75—St. Ignace, Michigan
BL I-75—Gaylord, Michigan
BL I-75—Grayling, Michigan
BL I-75—Roscommon, Michigan
BL I-75—West Branch, MichiganBL I-75—Saginaw, Michigan
BL I-75—Pontiac, Michigan
BL I-75—Findlay, Ohio
BL I-75—Sidney, Ohio
BL I-75—Troy–Piqua, OhioI-75 Bus.—Cordele, GeorgiaI-75 Bus.—Adel, Georgia
I-75 Bus.—Tifton, Georgia
I-75 Bus.—Valdosta, Georgia

Interstate 375
BS I-375—Detroit, Michigan (unsigned)

Interstate 76 (west)
State Highway 76B—Keenesburg, Colorado (Unsigned)
I-76 Bus.—Fort Morgan, Colorado—Sterling, Colorado

Interstate 376
I-376 Bus.—Moon Township, Pennsylvania (Created in 2009, replacing PA 60 Business.)

Interstate 80

I-80 Bus.—Sacramento, CaliforniaI-80 BS—Sacramento, California
I-80 Bus.—Truckee, CaliforniaI-80 Bus.—Lincoln, NebraskaI-80 Bus.—Sidney, Nebraska
I-80 Bus.—Verdi, Nevada
I-80 Bus.—Reno–Sparks, Nevada
I-80 Bus.—Winnemucca, Nevada
I-80 Bus.—Carlin, Nevada
I-80 Bus.—Battle Mountain, Nevada
I-80 Bus.—West Wendover, Nevada and Wendover, Utah
I-80 Bus.—Evanston, Wyoming
I-80 Bus.—Fort Bridger-Lyman, Wyoming
I-80 Bus.—Green River, Wyoming
I-80 Bus.—Rock Springs, Wyoming
I-80 Bus.—Rawlins, Wyoming
I-80 Bus.—Laramie, Wyoming
I-80 Bus.—Cheyenne, Wyoming
I-80 Bus.—Pine Bluffs, Wyoming

Interstate 83
I-83 Bus.—York, Pennsylvania

Interstate 84 (east)
I-84 Bus.—Newtown, Connecticut (Now signed as part of US Route 6.)

Interstate 84 (west)

I-84 Bus.—Nampa and Caldwell, Idaho (Part of old US 30)
I-84 Bus.—Mountain Home, Idaho
I-84 Bus.—Hammett, Idaho
I-84 Bus.—Glenns Ferry, Idaho
I-84 Bus.—Bliss, Idaho (unsigned)
I-84 Bus.—Jerome, Idaho (Possibly being planned further)
I-84 Bus.—Burley and Heyburn, Idaho
I-84 Bus.—Tremonton, Utah (Cosigned with Bus I-15)
I-84 Bus.—Brigham City, Utah (Cosigned with Bus I-15)

Interstate 85
I-85 Business—Greensboro, North Carolina (Soon to be removed)
I-85 Business—Spartanburg, South Carolina

Interstate 385
I-385 BS—Greenville, South Carolina (Unsigned since 2007)

Interstate 585I-585 BS—Spartanburg, South Carolina

Interstate 86 (west)
I-86 Bus.—American Falls, Idaho

Interstate 89I-89 BS—Lebanon, New Hampshire

Interstate 90

I-90 Bus.—Ellensburg, Washington
I-90 Bus.—Moses Lake, Washington
I-90 Bus.—Medical Lake, Washington
I-90 Bus.—Spokane Valley, Washington
I-90 Bus.—Wallace, Idaho
I-90 Bus.—Missoula, Montana
I-90 Bus.—Deer Lodge, Montana
I-90 Bus.—Butte, Montana (Co-signed with Bus. I-15 (Butte, Montana))
I-90 Bus.—Billings, Montana
I-90 Bus.—Sundance, Wyoming
I-90 Bus.—Spearfish, South Dakota
I-90 Bus.—Sturgis, South Dakota
I-90 Bus.—Rapid City, South Dakota
I-90 Bus.—Wall, South Dakota
I-90 Bus.—Kadoka, South Dakota
I-90 BS—Belvidere, South Dakota
I-90 Bus.—Murdo, South Dakota
I-90 Bus.—Vivian, South Dakota
I-90 Bus.—Presho, South Dakota
I-90 Bus.—Oacoma/Chamberlain, South Dakota
I-90 BS—White Lake, South Dakota (unsigned)
I-90 Bus.—Plankinton, South Dakota
I-90 Bus.—Mitchell, South Dakota
I-90 BS—Sioux Falls, South Dakota

Interstate 94

BL I-94—Benton Harbor–St. Joseph, Michigan
BS I-94—Kalamazoo, Michigan
BL I-94—Battle Creek, Michigan
BL I-94—Marshall, Michigan 
BL I-94—Albion, Michigan 
BL I-94—Jackson, Michigan 
BL I-94—Ann Arbor, Michigan 
BL I-94—Port Huron, Michigan

Interstate 95I-95 Bus.—Brunswick, Georgia
I-95 Bus.—Darien, Georgia 
I-95 Bus.—Fayetteville, North Carolina I-95 Bus.—Wilson and Rocky Mount, North Carolina I-95 Bus.—Emporia, Virginia I-95 Bus.—Wilmington, Delaware (Proposed around 2000 (I-95 would have shifted to what is still I-495), but rejected by city's mayor—section was temporarily signed as I-895 in early 1980s.)I-95 Bus.- Mystic, Connecticut 

Interstate 495I-495 BS—Lowell, Massachusetts 

Interstate 96BS I-96—Muskegon, MichiganBS I-96—Portland, Michigan
BL I-96—Lansing, Michigan
BL I-96—Howell, Michigan BL I-96—Farmington, Michigan BS I-96—Detroit, Michigan

Interstate 196
BL I-196—South Haven, Michigan
BL I-196—Holland, Michigan
BS I-196—Wyoming, Michigan

Interstate 496
Capitol Loop—Lansing, Michigan

Interstate 696BS I-696''—Detroit, Michigan

See also
 
 List of special routes of the United States Numbered Highway System

References

External links
Interstate Business Routes @ Interstate-Guide.com

 
Interstate Business